Jana Cieslarová (born 6 June 1971 in Třinec) is a Czech orienteering competitor who competed for Czechoslovakia until 1992. She won the 1991 Short distance World Orienteering Championships. She also has a silver medal in the Relay championship from 1989, and bronze medals from 1991, 1993 and 1995.

References

External links
 

1971 births
Living people
Sportspeople from Třinec
Czech orienteers
Czechoslovak orienteers
Female orienteers
Foot orienteers
World Orienteering Championships medalists